Shimen County is a northernmost county of Hunan Province, China, it is under administration of the prefecture-level city of Changde.

Located on the northern margin of Hunan and the west of Changde, Shimen County is bordered to the south and southwest by Taoyuan, Zili and Sangzhi Counties, to the west by Hefeng County of Hubei, to the north by Wufeng County of Hubei, to the east by Songzi City of Hubei, Li and Linli Counties. Shimen is also the home of the Tujia people, the descendant of Chinese ancient Ba People, the Tujia people shares 50.9％ of the population in the county.

It is divided into 19 towns and townships, five units of State-owned farms (as of 2016).

Administrative divisions

According to the result on adjustment of township-level administrative divisions of Shimen County on January, 2016 and May 29, 2015, Shimen County has four subdistricts, 11 towns, six townships and management area of five state-owned farms under its jurisdiction. they are:

4 subdistricts
 Chujiang Town (Chujiang and Yongxin subdistricts)
 Erdu Township (Erdu and Baofeng subdistricts)

11 towns	
Baiyun, Shimen
Hupingshan
Jiashan, Shimen
Mengquan
Moshi, Shimen
Nanbei
Taiping, Shimen
Weixin, Shimen
Xinguan, Shimen
Yijiadu
Zaoshi

6 townships
Luoping, Shimen
Sansheng, Shimen
Suojie
Xinpu, Shimen
Yanchi, Shimen
Ziliang, Shimen

5 State-owned farms	
Datongshan
Dongshanfeng
Longfengyuan
Luopusi
Xiupingyuan

Other unit
 the Management Office of Jiashan mountain

Climate

References

 
County-level divisions of Hunan
Changde